The Roman Catholic Diocese of Baruipur is a diocese located in the city of Baruipur in the Ecclesiastical province of Calcutta in India.

History
 May 30, 1977: Established as Diocese of Baruipur from the Metropolitan Archdiocese of Calcutta
 May 17, 2019: Father Shyamal Bose, the treasurer and chancellor of the diocese, was appointed Coadjutor Bishop to assist Bishop Salvadore Lobo in the pastoral and administrative of the diocese.

Saints and causes for canonisation
 Ante Gabric

Leadership
 Bishops of Baruipur (Latin Rite)
 Bishop Shyamal Bose (May 4, 2020 - current)
 Bishop Salvadore Lobo (October 16, 1997 – May 2020)
 Bishop Linus Nirmal Gomes, S.J. (May 30, 1977 – October 31, 1995)

References

External links
 GCatholic.org 
 Catholic Hierarchy 
 Diocese website

Roman Catholic dioceses in India
Christian organizations established in 1977
Roman Catholic dioceses and prelatures established in the 20th century
1977 establishments in West Bengal
Christianity in West Bengal
South 24 Parganas district